Avatha minima is a species of moth of the family Erebidae first described by Charles Swinhoe in 1918. It is found in the Philippines.

References

Moths described in 1918
Avatha
Moths of the Philippines
Taxa named by Charles Swinhoe